Lee Chang-hwan (born 16 March 1982) is a professional archer from South Korea. He competed in Archery at the 2006 Asian Games and won a gold medal with the men's team consisting of himself, Im Dong-hyun, Jang Yong-ho and Park Kyung-mo.

2008 Summer Olympics
At the 2008 Summer Olympics in Beijing Lee finished his ranking round with a total of 669 points, ten points behind leader Juan René Serrano. This gave him the tenth seed for the final competition bracket in which he faced Jiang Lin in the first round, beating the Chinese 112–108. In the second round Lee was too strong for Yusuf Ergin (117-109), breaking the Olympic Record. However, in the third round Lee and Cheng Chu-sian both came to 105 points and in the extra round Lee scored 18 points, while Cheng scored 19 points and eliminated Lee.

Together with Im Dong-hyun and Park Kyung-mo, he also took part in the team event. With his 669 score from the ranking round combined with the 670 of Im and the 676 of Park the Koreans were in first position after the ranking round, which gave them a straight seed into the quarter finals. With 224-222 they were too strong for the Polish team and in the semi final they beat home nation China 221–218. In the final Italy came close, but South Korea took the title with 227–225.

See also
 Korean archery
 Archery
 List of South Korean archers

References

External links 
 

Living people
1982 births
South Korean male archers
Olympic archers of South Korea
Archers at the 2008 Summer Olympics
Olympic gold medalists for South Korea
Place of birth missing (living people)
Olympic medalists in archery
Asian Games medalists in archery
Medalists at the 2008 Summer Olympics
Archers at the 2006 Asian Games
Archers at the 2010 Asian Games
Asian Games gold medalists for South Korea
Medalists at the 2006 Asian Games
Universiade medalists in archery
Universiade silver medalists for South Korea
21st-century South Korean people